That's TV is a national television network in the United Kingdom, broadcasting via Sky, Freesat and Freeview. That's TV started off as the owner of a number of local television licences in several conurbations, but even though regional news can still be found via these services, these channels simulacast the classic hits and television schedule of the national That's TV channel for most of the day. That's Television Ltd is owned by That's Media Ltd, which is based at The Flint Glass Works in the Ancoats neighbourhood of Manchester.

History
In September 2012, the broadcast regulator Ofcom announced That's TV had been awarded a licence to broadcast local TV service for Oxfordshire. Two months later, the company won a second licence for the Southampton and Portsmouth areas, in conjunction with newspaper publishers Newsquest and Johnston Press. That's Solent began broadcasting on 26 November 2014 while a soft launch of That's Oxford took place on 17 April 2015.

Prior to the launch of the Solent station, That's TV gained a further three licences in the south of England in June 2014 for the Guildford, Reading and Salisbury areas, followed a month later by a Basingstoke licence. In June 2015, a ninth licence was gained to serve the Carlisle area, in partnership with the CN Group.

The local TV licences for the Manchester and Preston/Blackpool areas were initially awarded to YourTV in February 2013, but both services failed to launch within the two-year timeframe permitted by the regulator. That's TV took a controlling stake in YourTV in March 2015 with the licences subsequently re-awarded. A soft launch of That's Manchester took place on 31 May 2015, followed by That's Lancashire on 24 August.

The founder of That's TV, Esther Rantzen, became the group's vice president when it opened its first station in Portsmouth and was lined up to present a weekly magazine programme. In May 2015, Rantzen resigned from the company along with former Meridian Broadcasting executive Mary McAnally.

In March 2016, Ofcom placed three of the stations – Manchester, Oxford and Solent – on notice over persistent technical issues.

In October 2016, it was announced That's TV had bought the licence for the York local TV service, formerly held by 'Hello York'. The group also bought out Cambridge TV.

On 2 January 2017, five That's TV stations (Cambridge, Lancashire, Manchester, Oxfordshire, Solent) started to simulcast Talking Pictures TV for six hours each day. In August 2017, That's TV bought Norfolk station Mustard TV.

In May 2018, That's TV agreed to acquire the assets of STV's STV2 channel launching on the 15th of October. In August 2018, That's TV bought Estuary TV's channel slots, covering North and North East Lincolnshire and the rest of the Lincolnshire area.

In July 2019, That's TV announced the closure of 13 of its 20 studios in order to downsize to seven regional production centres producing content for its 20 local stations. The remaining centres were announced as being located in Edinburgh, Glasgow, Manchester, York, Cambridge, Salisbury and Swansea.

In February 2021, That's TV started to broadcast nationally to viewers with a compatible internet connected HD television set, as it joined TV stations such as Spotlight TV and Yanga! on VisionTV's streaming service (found on Freeview channel 264).

That's TV's national channel launched as That's TV Gold. It began test broadcasts on 4 June 2021 on satellite frequency 11582 H DVB-S QPSK 22 5/6 under the label 52139. That's TV Gold will be on Sky channel 187. In order to be listed in the entertainment section (below channel 200) and not with the music channels (channels 350 to 399), That's TV started to acquire a number of documentaries and classic comedy series, in order that the national service was not a retro pop video network once the local news was taken out of the schedule.

On 9 July, That's TV Gold launched on Freeview channel 91, simulcasting its schedule with its 20 regional versions of That's TV on Freeview. The channel largely keeps the pop-video hits format of its local service but drops the evening local news and the TJC simulcast in the mornings, adding documentaries and concerts largely drawn from the IMC Vision catalogue.

On 11 October 2021, That's TV Gold launched on Freesat, broadcasting 24 hours per day on channel 178.

On 4 January 2022, That's TV dropped the word Gold from its national channel branding when it changed back from its Christmas schedule, even though it  was still licensed under the name of That's TV Gold at Ofcom. On 30 June 2022, the national That's TV channel received increased coverage on Freeview after it moved into FreeSports' slot on channel 65 when that channel stopped broadcasting on Freeview.

On 24 August 2022, That's TV increased its national operating hours on Freeview channel 65 by reducing their timeshare channel Classic Hits' music video schedule to 4am–7am. This gave That's TV an extra hour of entertainment programming each night between 3am and 4am on Freeview which is not covered by local television scheduling commitments (as they usually run local news on channel 7/8 between 3am and 6am). In addition to these changes, the company took over Country Music Entertainment's Freeview licence in Greater Manchester for their music video channel.

In July 2022, That's TV requested licences from Ofcom for services called That's Reality and That's Comedy. In November 2022, these were retitled That's 60s and That's 70s, ahead of the launch of an expanded suite of music video channels from the firm.

Programming
After being a channel focused on local news and weather, That's TV moved to a more 'networked' schedule with old films and cartoons broadcast during the day and a single news bulletin, shown on a loop during the evening and overnight, produced by each local station. After their deal with classic movie provider, Timeless  expired, That's TV started to simulcast various TV shopping and reality TV shows before bringing in more music programming in the evening.

By 2020, That's TV had become more of a music channel, showing blocks of 70s, 80s and 90s music videos throughout the day (when the service was not being used for home shopping/infomercials). According to official BARB ratings it had become the most viewed music channel on Freeview, beating AATW's channels based on the Now That's What I Call Music brand (Now 70s/Now 80s/Now 90s). On 12 November 2020, That's TV became That's Christmas and mixed up its music programming, so that Christmas hits (by people like Mariah Carey, Jane McDonald and Mud) would be played alongside 'party classics' from the 70s, 80s or 90s (for example Aqua, ABBA or Los del Río).

In November 2020, the newly rebranded That's Christmas was still showing TJC - The Jewellery Channel in the mornings, before broadcasting the "Retro Disco Christmas Party" the rest of the day with local news reduced to a 10-minute slot at 6 pm. That's TV also announced an agreement with STV to show all 1,516 episodes of Take the High Road from 2021. Episodes have started to be broadcast from February 2023.

In 2021, That's TV started to show music from the 1960s 'non-stop' each weekend, starting on Valentine's Day weekend with 48 hours of 60s music played back-to-back without adverts.

In October 2021, That's TV started to show Thames TV's early 1990s compilations of The Best of Tommy Cooper, which were previously shown on UKTV's Yesterday channel and the BAFTA-winning The Kenny Everett Video Show, a programme from 1978 which mixed music performances by people like Bryan Ferry with dance routines and comedy sketches. Both programmes were licensed from Thames TV rights holder Fremantle. On 19 October 2021, the channel started to show series 2 of Men Behaving Badly featuring the 'classic' line-up of Martin Clunes, Neil Morrissey, Caroline Quentin, and Leslie Ash. They did not schedule any of the episodes from series 1, featuring Harry Enfield as Dermot Povey, before that date or show any of the episodes made for the BBC.

On 18 November 2021, That's TV Gold rebranded for the festival period as That's TV Christmas and launched its Xmas schedule with repeats of The Benny Hill Show. The channel will be showing a number of Benny Hill specials made for Thames TV between 1969 to 1989 simultaneously on Freeview channel 91 and its network of local channels, with Hill's programmes showing in full for the first time on a national TV channel in 20 years.

Other comedians to be found on the channel over the festive period included Kenny Everett, Mike Yarwood, and Tommy Cooper, while the Carry On... team were seen in a number of Christmas TV specials. As well as programmes from Thames TV/Fremantle, That's TV also licensed the rights to LWT hidden camera show Beadle's About. This practical joke show was originally broadcast by ITV between November 1986 and September 1996, and like The Benny Hill Show, is another show which has not been repeated on British TV in a couple of decades.

In 2022, That's TV licensed the rights to classic 1980s children's TV series Press Gang, written by Steven Moffatt and starring Julia Sawalha, Lucy Benjamin, and Dexter Fletcher in early roles. Other rights picked up for rebroadcast by the channel in the first few months of 2022 included Sez Les with John Cleese, a Yorkshire Television sketch comedy show that starred Les Dawson alongside Monty Python member Cleese and Coronation Streets Roy Barraclough, Hylda Baker's sitcom Not On Your Nellie, Russ Abbott’s Madhouse and Autopsy, a programme with Dr. Michael Hunter from the Reelz Channel in America, turning up on the That's TV EPG under episode titles such as Larry Hagman: What Killed JR?, Luther Vandross: Killed by Food?, Bee Gee Andy: Inner Demons or Adam West: What Killed Batman?.

After broadcasting a number of episodes of the Les Dawson variety comedy show Sez Les, That's TV acquired broadcast rights of Monty Python's Flying Circus alongside repeats of The Kumars at No. 42, Whose Line Is It Anyway? and Harry Enfield’s Television Programme. By the end of March 2022, their weeknight comedy schedule included Monty Python every night alongside Hale and Pace and The Mrs Merton Show

On 4 September 2022, Till Death Us Do Part started airing on That's TV  as part of a nightly BBC sitcom double bill with The Fall and Rise of Reginald Perrin, with four 'lost episodes' ("Intolerance", "In Sickness and In Health", "State Visit" and "The Phone") included as part of the run by the channel. On 8 September 2022, the run was temporarily interrupted as the channel and Classic Hits were taken off air for 24 hours as a mark of respect for Queen Elizabeth II.

Notable programmes
 Through the Keyhole (originally broadcast by ITV/Yorkshire TV in 1987/1988)
 Rik Mayall Presents (originally broadcast by ITV/Granada Television International in 1993)
 Harry Enfield & Chums/Harry Enfield's Television Programme (originally made by Hat Trick Productions)
 The Benny Hill Show (Thames TV-era compilations)
Mike Yarwood Xmas Show/Mike Yarwood: This is His Life (1984 documentary)
Carry On Christmas (Thames TV-era specials)
The Goodies (BBC and ITV series)
A Bit of Fry and Laurie
The Fall and Rise of Reginald Perrin
Whatever Happened To the Likely Lads? 
The Kumars at No. 42
Mafia Women with Trevor McDonald
Serial Killer with Piers Morgan
Dinner Date
Till Death Us Do Part

 Local television services 
As of October 2018, the company operates services in 16 areas, all licensed by Ofcom under the Local Digital Television Programme.

 That's Cambridge – based at Cambridge
 That's Cumbria (was That's Carlisle) – based at Carlisle
 That's Hampshire – based at Basingstoke, north Hampshire
 That's Lancashire – based at Preston, also covering Blackpool, Chorley, Leyland and Lancaster
 That's Humber – based at Grimsby, also covering Hull, Bridlington, Scunthorpe, Lincoln, Skegness, Spalding, Mablethorpe, Louth, Sleaford and Boston
 That's Manchester – covering Greater Manchester (but not the Wigan area)
 That's Norfolk (was Mustard TV) – based at Norwich, covering most of Norfolk including Great Yarmouth, Cromer and Lowestoft
 That's North Yorkshire – based at Scarborough, also covering Filey and Whitby
 That's Oxfordshire – based at Reading
 That's Salisbury – based at Salisbury
 That's Scotland (was STV2) – covering Aberdeen, Ayr, Dundee, Edinburgh and Glasgow
 That's Solent – based at Portsmouth, also covering Southampton, Winchester and the Isle of Wight
 That's Surrey – based at Guildford, also covering Woking, Epsom and Ewell, Spelthorne, Elmbridge and Waverley
 That's Swansea Bay (was Bay TV Swansea) – based at Swansea and covering the Swansea Bay area
 That's Thames Valley – based at Reading
 That's York – based at York

 Criticism 
 BBC subsidies 

When launching his local TV initiative in 2011, Jeremy Hunt, then Culture Secretary, said, "Eight out of 10 consider local news important. Nearly seven out of 10 adults feel the localness of stories is more important than them being professionally produced. People in Barnham don't want to watch what is going on in Southampton. People in Chelmsford aren't interested in what's happening in Watford. That is the system we currently have at the moment, so that is what we are trying to rethink."

In June 2018, BuzzFeed revealed how That's TV had "gamed" the BBC's subsidy system to claim hundreds of thousands of pounds of licence fee payers' money, by submitting low-quality local news footage to the BBC, which under the system would pay £147.50 per segment, whether or not they were aired. The report also claimed that several of the company's stations had fewer than 30 viewers per day.

A former journalist for That's Solent reported that the station sent 1,207 stories to the BBC in year one (November 2014 to November 2015) but the BBC used only 114 (9.4% of stories), equating to a cost of £1,315 per story. The National Union of Journalists in Scotland said it was "deeply concerned" by McEwan's revelations and news that That's TV was launching five stations in Scotland.

McEwan wrote an investigative article for Private Eye magazine in March 2019 where he revealed that That's TV was refusing to tell the public where stations were broadcasting from. The report explained that That's TV deleted the addresses for its stations across the UK and replaced them with one contact address in a Lancashire business park. Ofcom also said it cannot give any details of where stations broadcast from. A longer version of the article was published by Star and Crescent, where McEwan revealed that the first station to launch – That's Solent in 2014 – had left Highbury College in Portsmouth. The station's whereabouts remain unknown, and both That's TV and the college did not comment. Viewers are uncertain if the station is in the Solent area: an observant viewer told McEwan that they saw a Salisbury postal address onscreen during a recent That's Solent news bulletin.

In May 2019, McEwan's investigations found that That's TV wanted to abandon the local communities it is publicly funded to serve. He found that That's TV had submitted plans to Ofcom to run the entire network of 20 local stations from seven studios/main production offices, which Ofcom had provisionally allowed.

 Mistreatment of staff 
Unpaid interns working for That's TV are reported to have "passed out through exhaustion".

In July 2018, former That's Solent journalist Dale McEwan reported his own experiences of working for the organisation. He listed bullying, exploitation, poor pay, and exhausting hours among his concerns.

In October 2018, McEwan continued his investigations into That's TV. Former That's TV staff members said the BBC was breaking its internal ethics code through its contract with the company. That's TV must adhere to the code as a supplier of video stories to the BBC. As the code states, suppliers "must pay wages sufficient to meet basic needs and to provide some discretionary income". But That's TV's decision to pay staff the National Minimum Wage on zero-hour contracts and expect them to cover their own large petrol costs means that staff are effectively earning poverty wages.

 Broadcast locations 
McEwan found evidence suggesting that That's Hampshire staff were sharing the office of That's Thames Valley in Reading. Ofcom said it is a licence condition for all local TV licensees to ensure that the main production base of the licensed service, and/or studio from which the licensed service is broadcast, is located within the licensed area. The regulator confirmed a station's office can be based outside of the licensed area, but prior written consent must be given. Ofcom said consent had not been given to That's TV. Ofcom added that it was investigating and would take action if it found a breach of licence had taken place.

Ofcom also revealed that it was not taking any action against That's TV for apparent licence breaches. But evidence had previously been found that That's TV had already started operating stations from outside of the local communities. This evidence was found before That's TV submitted its plans for studio/office sharing across the network (for example, That's Hampshire explained above). McEwan also pushed Ofcom for details about where stations were located. Ofcom gave limited details in a Freedom of Information response published in the same article. Six of That's TV's 20 stations already did not have a studio or office in the licensed area. Five licences had an office in the licensed area but used a studio outside of the area to record programmes. That's Solent was one of nine licences that Ofcom believed had a studio in the licensed area. However, in what appeared to be a blunder, a YouTube video showed a That's Solent presenter reading out the station contact details for That's Salisbury during a pre-recorded bulletin on 5 February 2019. The presenter then gave the contact details for That's Solent.

Ofcom's letter of approval to That's TV said journalists would still be based in the local licensed areas but without physical premises. Ofcom explained That's TV's "commitment for journalists and reporters to continue to collect, develop and record interviews on location within the licensed area..." Ofcom believed this meant that the "local presence" of stations like That's Solent would be "maintained". The regulator also stated, "That's TV has confirmed that viewers of the services will not notice any difference in the content broadcast, with news items and interviews still recorded within the licensed area..." But sites like Star & Crescent previously watched That's Solent news bulletins that aired many stories from outside of the Solent area. For example, the top story in one news bulletin was about Salisbury, with the show also featuring stories from Basingstoke, Newbury, and Birmingham. A former employee of another That's TV station said Ofcom's claim that viewers would not notice any difference in news content "completely misses the point". They said, "Out of a total of usually six to ten stories (completely depending on video times), three or four are filmed within the station location and the remaining are filmed out with, usually a completely different city. The news programmes [at this station] have always contained news stories from out within the licensed area. This is the same for all over the UK."

In July 2019, McEwan continued his investigations after Ofcom officially announced permission for That's TV to close 13 studios in its network of 20 local TV stations across the UK. That's TV was allowed to operate from seven regional studios, as predicted by McEwan in his previous report. For example, That's Solent was now included within a "South of England" hub and would be broadcast from That's Salisbury's studio in Salisbury along with the stations for Basingstoke, Guildford, Oxford, and Reading. All news shows from these stations were to be hosted by presenters in Salisbury. But McEwan's previous investigation revealed signs that That's Solent had already departed from the Solent area and started broadcasting from Salisbury months before Ofcom gave consent for the move. A former That's Solent journalist, who wished to remain anonymous, described the decision as a "joke". A source close to That's TV employees also claimed staff read about nationwide studio closures on news sites rather than being told by management.

In December 2019, Star & Crescent published the following update to its story about the closure of 13 studios in That's TV's network of 20 licences: That's TV chief executive Daniel Cass had previously told BBC News in July 2019: "Does it make sense to be investing resources in 20 physical premises where you're tying up quite a lot of your reporters and journalists in administration and technical work rather than doing what we're doing going forward, which is freeing them up to spend significant time to be journalists?" This comment referred to That's TV's premises across the UK and implied that the company had, or at least wanted to have, premises for each of its 20 licences. The comment implied that the company, "going forward", wanted to do something different compared to what it had been doing. In the interest of accuracy, Star & Crescent found evidence that this is a misleading comment from Cass. Former That's TV Scotland freelancers said there was a lack of premises in Scotland, meaning there were not "20 physical premises" for each of the 20 licences. Freelancers said there was only one studio in Scotland, which served all of the five Scottish licences. Freelancers also had to work from home or use WiFi in Costas and Starbucks, or Regus business lounges, in their local areas. This was because, out of the five Scottish licences, Glasgow was the only locality that had a permanent production office. Prior to Cass' comment to BBC News in July 2019, Ofcom had also confirmed in a freedom of information reply in April 2019 that it had no address details for either production offices or studios in the licensed areas of Aberdeen, Ayr, Dundee and Edinburgh. This also means that That's TV did not have 20 studios in its network, so the BBC News article was incorrect.

In 2021, Ofcom agreed to the request from That's TV to reduce the number of production bases it has in regards to its newsgathering with some local news items to be produced outside the broadcast areas the company holds the licence for. That's TV hopes to have most of its news bulletins produced in studios based in Salford (for England) or Glasgow (for Scotland), with additional offices operating in Reading, Norwich, and Swansea (with news programmes for Wales to be either produced in Salford or Glasgow in the future).

 Other 
McEwan wrote another investigative article in October 2018. He found that at least four colleges and universities had asked the local That's TV stations to leave the premises. For example, Queen Mary's College (QMC) in Basingstoke served notice on That's Hampshire in summer 2018 after the BuzzFeed investigation. That's TV did not, however, inform broadcast regulator Ofcom about the station's change of address; the QMC address was still displayed on Ofcom's website months after the station left QMC.

A Freedom of Information reply from Highbury College disclosed that That's Solent left the college in November 2018 by "mutual consent", but did not elaborate further. The letter also showed that That's TV rented premises at Highbury for free during its entire four-year contract. This was despite the broadcaster standing to earn millions of pounds of BBC licence fee funding. That's TV had agreed to offer training opportunities to Highbury students in return for the studio and office space, but former That's Solent employees previously said That's TV was not benefiting Highbury students' education

Music channels

In spring 2022, That's TV acquired additional space on the limited-reach COM7 Freeview DVB-T2 multiplex and elected to launch a 24-hour music channel called That's Music. The channel launched on Freeview channel 92 on 13 April 2022, with the intention that when both this and the main That's TV network would be broadcasting music, a different decade would be showcased on each, and with music continuing on the new channel when That's Entertainment (the section usually made up of documentaries and old sitcoms) would be broadcast in the weekly schedules.

On 30 June 2022, with the COM7 multiplex closing, the music channel's name was changed to Classic Hits and its Freeview broadcast arrangements were changed, with its channel number moving up one place to channel 91. The channel moved to a more widely-available Freeview DVB-T broadcast multiplex, but would now broadcast on Freeview only at night.

The 24 hour version of Classic Hits subsequently reappeared on satellite, and launched on Sky channel 366 on 2 August 2022. 

On 24 August 2022, That's TV further reduced the hours of Classic Hits on Freeview to three hours a night, so they could run their main entertainment channel until 4am. In tandem with reducing the hours of Classic Hits nationally, That's TV entered into a deal where they would take on the Freeview licence of channel operator Entertainment Television Channels, who had a 24 hour slot on the Greater Manchester multiplex for their Country Music Entertainment (CME) brand. This music channel was broadcast on linear Freeview to viewers in Manchester, but also could be accessed
nationally via streaming operator On Demand 365 on Freeview channel 265 and as an online radio station. As a result of their deal with That's TV, from 24 August 2022, the 24-hour version of Classic Hits joined the channels available in the Manchester area, labelled Classic Hits MCR and listed on channel 91 (where the national late-night Classic Hits had been situated), with the part-time national Classic Hits channel moving up to the old CME slot on Freeview 88. CME ceased to broadcast as a linear channel as a result, but could be still accessed nationwide as a streaming channel via On Demand 365.

The satellite broadcast of Classic Hits was made fully available on the Freesat platform in December 2022. 

On 6 January 2023, Classic Hits was split into multiple decade-themed channels, branded as That's 60s, That's 70s, That's 80s and That's 90s', with the aim of competing with established services such as MTV 80s, MTV 90s, Now 70s and Now 80s. A 20-hour broadcast of That's 60s was made available on Freeview nationally in space freed up by the closure that day of the Smithsonian Channel. A 'video playlist' presented by Tony Blackburn was the first programme shown on That's 60s with "Flowers in the Rain" by The Move being the first performance, played a reference to Tony Blackburn being the first presenter on BBC Radio 1 in 1967. As the music video era did not really start for another decade, That’s 60s will mostly use live band clips and performances taken from worldwide pop TV shows made in that era. In addition That's 60s have plans to have programmes presented by David Hamilton and Bob Harris in the future. In addition to launching on Freeview, That's 60s was launched onto Sky and Freesat, directly replacing Classic Hits on satellite. 

The existing Classic Hits channels on Freeview - full-time in Manchester and part-time nationally - were replaced by That's 80s. A few days later, a broadcast of That's 80s began transmitting on the Astra satellite; this was added to the Sky satellite EPG on 16 January. Unlike its 60s sibling, That's 80s was not added to the Freesat EPG but the free-to-air broadcast can be manually tuned-in on Freesat equipment as with other free channels.

In addition to That's 60s and That's 80s nationally, slots for four channels - the 60s and 80s services running full-day, plus slots allocated for That's 70s and That's 90s - were placed onto Freeview in the Greater Manchester area, utilising the local multiplex originally established for the defunct Channel M service. The 60s and 80s channels are labelled with 'MCR' after their names to differentiate these from the nationwide feeds. That's 70s and 90s were not fully launched with programming at the time of their addition to the programme guide, instead running placeholders with a "Coming Soon" message.

In mid-March 2023, a video test feed for That's 70s began transmitting on the Astra satellite.

Notes

References

External links
 

Local television channels in the United Kingdom
Companies based in Manchester
Television channels and stations established in 2014
Mass media companies of the United Kingdom